Burt Plumb McKinnie (January 17, 1879 – November 22, 1946) was an American golfer who competed in the 1904 Summer Olympics. In 1904 he was part of the American team which won the silver medal. He finished 17th in this competition. In the individual competition he finished 11th in the qualification and won the bronze medal after losing in the semi-finals.

References

External links
 Profile

American male golfers
Amateur golfers
Golfers at the 1904 Summer Olympics
Olympic silver medalists for the United States in golf
Olympic bronze medalists for the United States in golf
Medalists at the 1904 Summer Olympics
1879 births
1946 deaths